Nithya Ram is an Indian actress and model who works in Kannada, Tamil and Malayalam soap operas and a few films. She began her career as an actress in Kannada television soap operas. She is the elder sister of actress Rachita Ram. As of 2017, she played the main lead in the mega hit show Nandini as Nandini and Ganga.

Early life and career 
Nithya Ram comes from a family of artists with her father K. S. Ramu and sister Rachita Ram  being classical dancers themselves, and the latter has since appeared in films. Nithya is a trained classical dancer from Welight Academy as well. She holds a graduate degree in biotechnology and worked for some time, but her "dream of becoming a heroine never died."

Nithya started her career as an actress with a Kannada television show opera Benkiyalli Aralida Hoovu, which aired on Zee Kannada, that co-starred her sister as well. She went on to appear in other Kannada shows such as Karpoorada Gombe, Rajkumari and Eradu Kanasu. Following this, she worked in one Telugu movie, i. e., Muddhu Bidda. After that, she had been signed for a film opposite Diganth, which however failed to take off. In 2014, she was signed to play a lead role in Muddu Manase opposite Aru Gowda. Around the time, she signed to her second movie opera in Telugu, Amma Naa Kodala. Later, She also played the lead role in the Tamil superhit television serial Nandini.

Filmography

Television

Films

See also 
 List of Indian film actresses
 List of Tamil film actresses
 List of Indian television actresses

References

External links 
 

Living people
Kannada actresses
Actresses in Kannada cinema
Indian film actresses
21st-century Indian actresses
Indian television actresses
Actresses in Kannada television
Actresses in Telugu television
Actresses in Tamil television
1988 births
Actresses in Malayalam cinema